Sea Lake is a closed railway station on the Kulwin railway line located in the town of Sea Lake, Victoria, Australia. The last regular passenger service ran from Bendigo to Sea Lake on 7 May 1977 and was operated by a DERM. It retains a weatherboard building and the passenger platform.

The station is a destination for grain trains operated by companies such as El Zorro, to the AWB GrainFlow terminal.

References

Disused railway stations in Victoria (Australia)